The Czech Republic competed at the 2011 World Championships in Athletics from August 27 to September 4 in Daegu, South Korea.

Team selection

The Czech athletic federation will send a 21-member strong team (13 women and 8 men) into the event including world season leaders Barbora Špotáková (Javelin Throw) and Zuzana Hejnová (400m Hurdles) and European indoor medallists from Paris Denisa Rosolová (400m), Jaroslav Bába (High Jump) and Roman Šebrle (Decathlon).

The following athletes appeared on the preliminary Entry List, but not on the Official Start List of the specific event:

Medalists
The following  competitor from the Czech Republic won a medal at the Championships

Results

Men

Decathlon

Women

Heptathlon

References

External links
Official local organising committee website
Official IAAF competition website

Nations at the 2011 World Championships in Athletics
World Championships in Athletics
2011